Lost Souls is a 2000 American horror film directed by Janusz Kamiński, in his directorial debut. The film stars Winona Ryder, Ben Chaplin, Elias Koteas, and John Hurt.

Plot

A small group of fervent Roman Catholics believe Satan intends to become man just as God did in the person of Jesus. Writings from a seemingly-possessed psychiatric patient lead them to Peter Kelson. The group suspect it is Kelson's body Satan has chosen to occupy. The youngest of the group, Maya Larkin, meets Peter to investigate further and try to convince him of embodied evil. Other signs come to Kelson as he and Maya take a journey full of strange occurrences, self-discovery and an ultimate showdown.

Cast
 Winona Ryder as Maya Larkin
 Ben Chaplin as Peter Kelson
 Sarah Wynter as Claire Van Owen
 Philip Baker Hall as Father James
 John Hurt as Father Lareaux
 W. Earl Brown as William Kelson
 Alfre Woodard as Dr. Allen	
 Elias Koteas as John Townsend
 Brian Reddy as Father Frank Page
 John Beasley as Detective Mike Smythe
 John Diehl as Henry Birdson
 Brad Greenquist as George Viznik 
 Anna Gunn as Sally Prescott

Production
The film was shot in 1998 on location in Los Angeles and New York City in America. The film was initially set for release in October 1999. However, due to a flood of "end of the world" and supernatural horror movies such as End of Days and Stigmata scheduled for release around the same time, a decision was made to delay the film. The second release date, February 2000, was also cancelled due to a conflict with the very popular Scream franchise. A final release date of October 2000 was finally decided upon, which also happened to be exactly the same day as the re-release of The Exorcist.

Reception
The film opened at #3 at the North American box office making USD$7,954,766 in its opening weekend. Lost Souls ultimately grossed only $31.3 million worldwide, making it a box office bomb.

The film was given very negative reviews from critics, though the condemnation was somewhat tempered by praise for its photography and atmosphere. On Rotten Tomatoes it has a rating of 8% based on 91 reviews, with the website's consensus stating: "Though Kaminski's film is visually stylish, Lost Souls is just another derivative entry in the Apocalypse genre, with lackluster direction, unengaging characters, and no scares." At Metacritic, which assigns a normalized rating to reviews, the film has an average weighted score of 16 out of 100, based on 29 critics, indicating "overwhelming dislike". Audiences polled by CinemaScore gave the film a rare "F" grade on an A+ to F scale.

Elvis Mitchell in The New York Times wrote: "There are some particularly fine visual details; it's the central story that's lacking ... After what is supposed to be a harrowing moment, Kelson says, 'I was surprised but I was never frightened.' That about sums up Lost Souls." Jonathan Rosenbaum in The Chicago Reader dismissed the film as "visually striking set pieces set loose in a void. Steven Rea wrote in The Philadelphia Inquirer, "Despite its spooky, color-desaturated visuals, guffaws, not screams, are more in order. Carla Meyer wrote in the San Francisco Chronicle, "Even a badly executed horror movie can achieve cheesy greatness. This one, unfortunately, is too somber for that. It's artfully shot -- to be expected with Kaminski as director -- with everything bathed in green and golden light. The set designers should be commended for their fine choice in lamps -- from Tiffany to Deco, they're fabulous, even in the priests' quarters. But when the furniture stands out more than the story, the movie's a stinker." Roger Ebert wrote in his review, "Lost Souls possesses the art and craft of a good movie, but not the story. For a thriller about demonic possession and the birth of the antichrist, it's curiously flat. All through the movie, I found myself thinking about how well it was photographed. Not a good sign."

The critical review from Film4 wrote: "Concluding with an ending reminiscent of both The Game and Jacob's Ladder (though delivered with the panache of neither), Lost Souls is not worth seeking out."

References

External links
 
 
 
 
 
 
 

2000 horror films
2000s thriller films
American supernatural horror films
Religious horror films
2000 films
New Line Cinema films
Films scored by Jan A. P. Kaczmarek
2000 directorial debut films
Films set in New York City
2000s English-language films
2000s American films